The Birkebein Party or Birkebeinar ((nynorsk) or  (bokmål)) was the name for a rebellious party in Norway, formed in 1174 around the pretender to the Norwegian throne, Eystein Meyla. The name has its origins in propaganda from the established party that the rebels were so poor that they made their shoes of birch bark. Although originally a pejorative, the opposition adopted the Birkebeiner name for themselves, and continued using it after they came to power in 1184.

Today, the Birkebeins are popularly celebrated for having escorted the two-year-old Haakon Haakonsson, an heir to the Norwegian throne, safely from Lillehammer to Østerdalen to Trondheim, a long and perilous journey through treacherous mountains and forests. This is commemorated through cross-country ski races, Birkebeinerrennet and Birkebeinerrittet.

Background
The Civil war era in Norway (borgerkrigstiden) is a term used for the period between 1130 and 1240 in the history of Norway. During this period there were several interlocked conflicts of varying scale and intensity. Although weak in the beginning, the Birkebeiners had the upper hand for most of the conflict's duration. King Haakon IV was the ultimate victor for the Birkebeiners in 1217. In the earlier part of the reign of King Haakon, much of the royal power was in the hands of Skule Bårdsson. In 1239, the conflict between the two erupted into open warfare, when Skule had himself proclaimed king in Nidaros. The rebellion ended in 1240 when Skule was put to death.

The background for these conflicts was the unclear Norwegian succession laws, social conditions and the struggle between Church and King. There were then two main parties, firstly known by varying names or no names at all, but finally condensing into the parties of Bagler and Birkebeiners. The rallying point was regularly a royal son, who was set up as the figurehead of the party in question, to oppose the rule of the king from the contesting party.

Formation
The Birkebein party was formed of some earlier groups with the original goal of deposing king Magnus V of Norway (Magnus Erlingsson) and his father Earl Erling Skakke. From a socio-historical perspective, scholars have interpreted the party as the result of the rapid increase in landless markamenn (meaning "border men"), who settled along the Swedish border and made their living by pillaging the rich old settlements. It was this lawless population that became the foremost basis of the Birkebeiner, even though it is questionable whether their leaders were paupers wearing shoes made of birch bark.

Their leadership came from Trøndelag, a region where the social tensions were not as marked, and their motive was rather to stop the transition of power from Trøndelag to Viken and Vestlandet. The powerful Trønder families were simply being left behind by their peers in the south, who had acquired a strong leader in the Vestland earl Erling Skakke in the mid-12th century. In the early 1160s, Erling had taken control of Viken and the bishopric of Nidaros and had subsequently made his underage son Magnus Erlingsson the king of Norway. The party that was behind their rule was not called the Bagli party (Bagler) during their time, but only later. The rival forces against the Birkebeins were dubbed several names, successively Lendsmenn, Heklungs, Kuvlungs, Øyskjeggs and Bagler.

The rise of Sverre
After some initial victories for the Viken party, the tables turned when Sverre entered the political scene claiming to be the illegitimate son of king Sigurd Munn. Sverre sought assistance from the Swedish earl Birger Brosa who sent him Swedish forces after some hesitation. One of Birger Brosa's sons, Philippus Birgersson, became Sverre's earl.

Under Sverre's leadership, the Birkebeiner movement was re-organized and pruned and the most criminal elements were brutally purged from the party. The army consisted more and more of mercenaries from Sweden and England. As early as 1177, Sverre was proclaimed king by his followers, but in reality his power did not extend beyond the borders of Trøndelag and it took two decisive battles in 1179 and 1184 before he could be formally elected king. By then, both the main opponents were dead, i.e., earl Erling (1179) and King Magnus Erlingsson (1184), and the opposition was greatly reduced.

The Birkebeiner's political program was a continuation of earl Erling's centralization which underscores the geographical motivations behind the movement. Their leadership did not seek a social revolution, only to move the centre of power back to Trøndelag. The opposition around Viken organized in 1196 into a new faction called the Bagler.

1200 onwards
Around the year 1200, the rival groups shared the goal of controlling the entire country. In 1202, when King Sverre died, he had managed to acquire most of Norway, but in Østerdalen, the Baglers were still very powerful. Sverre's death meant some decrease in the power of the Birkebeins. His successor, King Haakon Sverresson, died only two years later, leaving his son Haakon Haakonsson as the ultimate target for the Baglers to get rid of the pretender to the throne. In 1206, the Birkebeiners set off on a dangerous journey through treacherous mountains and forests, taking the now two-year-old Haakon Haakonsson to safety in Trondheim. Norwegian history credits the Birkebeiners' bravery with preserving the life of the boy who later became King Haakon Haakonsson IV, ended the civil wars in 1240 and forever changing Northern Europe's history through his reign. The events surrounding the journey are dramatised in The Last King (film).

The Birkebeins managed to hold some power, despite short reigns of their monarchs. In 1209, a resolution was made between Bagler and Birkebeiner. Bagler pretender Philip Simonsson was recognized as ruler of the eastern third of the country, Østlandet, without the title of king. Birkebeiner's Inge Baardsson was recognized to be King of Norway. They both died in 1217 and Birkebeiner-born Haakon IV ascended the throne, relatively unopposed, under the regency of Duke Skule.

Birkebeiner traditions

The city arms of Lillehammer show a Birkebeiner skiing in honour of the historic rescue. The mascots Håkon and Kristin of the 1994 Winter Olympics are depicted as Birkebeiner children, bearing the names of the son and daughter of king Sverre. Near Drammen, the sports association Idrettsforeningen Birkebeineren took their name from the party.

Birkebeiner Run
Today, the historic event of the rescue of Haakon Haakonsson is honoured in Norway by three annual sporting events, a run, Birkebeinerløpet; a mountain bike race, Birkebeinerrittet; a cross-country ski race, Birkebeinerrennet and, beginning in 2012, Landeveisbirken, a road bicycle race. Common for the bike and ski events is the requirement of carrying a backpack weighing 3.5 kg as a remembrance of the child the Birkebeiners had to carry on their journey. The bike and ski events start in Rena and all three events finish in Lillehammer. There are also sister cross-country ski races held in Hayward Wisconsin (United States) (the American Birkebeiner), in Edmonton (Canada) (the Canadian Birkebeiner) and in Falls Creek (Australia).

References

Other sources
 Gjerset, Knut History of the Norwegian People  (The MacMillan Company. 1915)
 Helle, Knut Under kirke og kongemakt : 1130-1350 (Aschehougs Norgeshistorie. 1995) Norwegian
 Holmsen, Andreas (Norges historie) fra de eldste tider til 1660  (flere nytrykk. 1939) Norwegian
 Larson, Karen  A History of Norway (Princeton University Press. 1948)
 Lunden, Kåre Norge under Sverreætten, 1177-1319 (Cappelens Norgeshistorie.1976) Norwegian
 Krag, Claus Sverre: Norges største middelalderkonge (Aschehoug. 2005) Norwegian

Norwegian civil wars